The Fragrant Hills Pagoda of the Fragrant Hills in Beijing, China was built in 1780 during the reign of the Qianlong Emperor (1735–1796) as part of the Grand Zongjing Monastery. Although the monastery located just north of the pagoda was burned down by the Eight-Nation Alliance in 1900, the Fragrant Hills Pagoda was unharmed by the nearby fires. The pagoda is octagonal-shaped, 40 m (130 ft) tall with seven stories, and has a stone square-platform at the base to support the structure. The pagoda is adorned with glazed tiles of yellow, green, purple, and blue hues. Surrounding the pagoda at the base is a wooden Chinese pavilion with supporting columns, this structure crowned with a white marble railing and terrace.

External links
Fragrant Hills Pagoda at China.org.cn

Buddhist temples in Beijing
Pagodas in China
Qing dynasty architecture
18th-century Buddhist temples
Religious buildings and structures completed in 1780
Towers completed in 1780
1780s establishments in China